The Military ranks of the Kingdom of Romania were the military insignia used by the Kingdom of Romania. Following the abolition of the monarchy, the ranks were replaced with those of the Socialist Republic of Romania.

Commissioned officer ranks
The rank insignia of commissioned officers.

Other ranks
The rank insignia of non-commissioned officers and enlisted personnel.

References
Citations

Bibliography

External links
 

Angola
Military of Angola